The Public Transport Service Corporation or better known as PTSC is the state-owned public transport provider for Trinidad and Tobago. Its headquarters are at City Gate in Port of Spain (formerly the Trinidad Government Railway headquarters).  Passengers have to buy the tickets  at a ticket booth and show it to the driver. The fares vary with distance. There are two type of buses: the blue-and-white buses are the regular and the red-and-white are the express commuter buses. The latter are more expensive, make fewer stops and are more comfortable.

History

Trinidad began with the establishment of the Trinidad Railway Company in 1846. The Company surveyed the country with the intention of implementing a railway system. However, the finances needed to continue with this project were not available.

Subsequently, on Saturday 5 March 1859 the Cipero Tramroad became Trinidad’s first railway. It was planters’ line that passed between Mission (now Princes Town) and       Kings Wharf at San Fernando. It was used primarily to transport produce from the remote estates of the Naparimas out to Kings Wharf to waiting ships. The man responsible for this tramway was sugar planter William Eccles.

The tramway was used primarily for transporting produce but there was a great demand for the transportation of workers from one estate to another along the line. A number of prominent persons also indicated their desire to commute by tramway rather than by horseback. The owners of the tramways could not ignore the demands of the commuters and facilitated a few passengers; this started the tramway’s first passenger service. It also acted as the first postal service between San Fernando and Mission. The Cipero Tramroad was greatly successful and lasted up to the 1920s before it was absorbed into the Trinidad Government Railway.

City Service

PTSC city service is a service which operates within both Port Of Spain and San Fernando

Know Your Country Tours

This tour begins at the historic Railway Building, South Quay, Port of Spain and journeys to the South East Coast of the island. Along the way, patrons will learn about places of interest, our people’s history and local folklore.
On approaching the coast, patrons will get the opportunity to see the splendor of the mouth of the Ortoire River. This river is fifty (50) km long and extends into the Atlantic Ocean. Fishes and manatees are abundant in these waters.
Patrons will also be afforded the opportunity to observe the beauty of Manzanilla Beach, and enjoy the scenic drive through Manzanilla Road which is lined with coconut trees and the Atlantic Ocean running along its coastline. The name Manzanilla was derived from Spanish sailors in the 18th century, because it was thickly covered with small round poisonous fruits called manchineels. These fruits resembled small apples and thus the name Manzanilla (“small apples”)
The final point of interest along this route is Mayaro. Mayaro is one of the earliest villages in Trinidad. It was an Arawak settlement before the arrival of the Spanish. The name “Mayaro” means place of the maya plant; which was of great importance to the Amerindians.
Here, patrons can indulge themselves in beach activities or simply just enjoy the sound of the crashing waves.

Travel Card
The PTSC Travel Card gives a choice of unlimited travel along specific routes being operated by the Public Transport Service Corporation.

In 1993, the Travel Card alternative was introduced and to date its Membership has steadily increased.

Fleet
P.T.S.C. Fleet Info

Transport companies established in 1965
Government-owned companies of Trinidad and Tobago